Lawrence "Larry" Duffy (born 27 November 1951) is an Irish Roman Catholic prelate who has served as Bishop of Clogher since 2019.

Early life and education

Duffy was born on 27 November 1951 in Magheracloone, County Monaghan, one of five children to Thomas and Elizabeth Duffy. In his youth, he played Gaelic football for Magheracloone Mitchells.

Duffy attended primary school at Ballynagearn National School and secondary school at the Patrician High School, Carrickmacross, before studying for the priesthood at St Patrick's, Carlow College.

He was ordained a priest for the Diocese of Clogher on 13 June 1976.

Presbyteral ministry 
Following ordination, Duffy's first pastoral assignment was as curate in Enniskillen. He was subsequently appointed curate in Castleblayney in 1978, and the cathedral parish in Monaghan in 1994.

Between 1998 and 2002, Duffy worked as a missionary in the Diocese of Kitui, Kenya, between 1998 and 2002, during which time he helped to lead the construction of a church in Mwingi and supported religious communities in constructing schools in the diocese.

He returned to the Diocese of Clogher in 2003, when he was appointed parish priest in Ederney. Duffy was subsequently appointed parish priest in Clones in 2008, and in Carrickmacross in 2013. Prior to his episcopal appointment, he had also served as administrator in his native parish of Magheracloone, vicar general of the diocese between 2013 and 2016, and also as dean of the diocesan chapter of canons.

Episcopal ministry 
Duffy was appointed Bishop-elect of Clogher by Pope Francis on 8 December 2018. The appointment was seen as unusual, as new bishops in Ireland of late had tended to be appointed from outside a diocese, rather than within.

He was consecrated by the Archbishop of Armagh and Primate of All Ireland, Eamon Martin, on 10 February 2019 in St Macartan's Cathedral, Monaghan.

In an interview with The Irish Times on 15 October 2020, Duffy spoke of the frustration felt by people in his diocese who could attend public Mass in parishes within Northern Ireland during the COVID-19 pandemic, but not in the Republic of Ireland. In an interview with The Irish Catholic on 22 October 2020, he stated his belief that the restriction on public prayer during Level 3 restrictions in the Republic of Ireland was "severe".

References

External links 

 Bishop Lawrence Duffy on Catholic-Hierarchy.org
 Bishop Lawrence Duffy on GCatholic
 Bishop Lawrence Duffy on Diocese of Clogher

1951 births
Living people
Alumni of Carlow College
People from County Monaghan
21st-century Roman Catholic bishops in Ireland
Roman Catholic bishops of Clogher